Actinokineospora alba is a Gram-positive and aerobic bacterium from the genus of Actinokineospora which has been isolated from soil from Xinjiang, China.

References

Pseudonocardiales
Bacteria described in 2010